Andrea Ballerini (born 7 February 1973) is an Italian former Grand Prix motorcycle road racer.

Ballerini was born in Florence.  In 2001, he won the European 125cc road racing championship. His best year in the world championships was in 2006 when he finished in 17th place in the 125cc world championship. In 2003 Ballerini won the 125cc Australian Grand Prix.

Career statistics

Grand Prix motorcycle racing

Races by year
(key) (Races in bold indicate pole position)

References

1973 births
Sportspeople from Florence
Italian motorcycle racers
125cc World Championship riders
250cc World Championship riders
Living people